Abecedarian is a 16th-century German sect that rejected any education above the minimal level.

Abecedarian may also refer to:

 A-b-c-darian, the youngest students in the typical one-room school of 19th-century America
 Abecedarian Early Intervention Project, a 1972 controlled experiment in North Carolina, United States
 Abecedarians (band), an American post-punk trio active in the 1980s
 Abecedarian hymn, a hymn in which the first letter of every verse follows the order of the alphabet

See also
 Abecedarium, an inscription of the letters of an alphabet in order
 Abecedarius, an acrostic with first letters in alphabetic order
 Alphabet (disambiguation)
 Alphabetical (disambiguation)